Santa Catalina Island is a small Colombian island in the Caribbean Sea. It belongs to the San Andrés y Providencia Department of Colombia and is the northernmost island in South America. The island has two bays: Old John Bay and Eliza Bay.

It is connected by a   footbridge to its larger sister Providencia Island, to the south.

It has a dry climate with two annual rain periods.

References

Islands of the Archipelago of San Andrés, Providencia and Santa Catalina